Winning the Oil Endgame: Innovation for Profits, Jobs and Security is a 2005 book by Amory B. Lovins, E. Kyle Datta, Odd-Even Bustnes, Jonathan G. Koomey, and Nathan J. Glasgow, published by the Rocky Mountain Institute.  It presents an independent, transdisciplinary analysis of four ways to reduce petroleum dependence in the United States:
Using oil more efficiently, through smarter technologies that wring more (and often better) services from less oil (pp. 29–102).
Substituting for petroleum fuels other liquids made from biomass or wastes (pp. 103–111).
Substituting saved natural gas for oil in uses where they’re interchangeable, such as furnaces and boilers (pp. 111–122). 
Replacing oil with hydrogen made from non-oil resources (pp. 228–242).

Problems and solutions

The authors explain that the problems of oil dependence are manageable, suggesting that oil dependence is a problem we need no longer have. The proposed solutions to oil dependence are profitable and U.S. oil dependence can be eliminated by proven and attractive technologies that create wealth, enhance choice, and strengthen common security. The authors argue that America can lead the world into the post-petroleum era and create a vibrant economy. (p.xiii)

Reviews

Winning the Oil Endgame has received many positive reviews and the Wall Street Journal called the book "Perhaps the most rigorous and surely the most dramatic analysis of what it will take to wean us from foreign oil ... carried out by the Rocky Mountain Institute, a respected center of hard-headed, market-based research."

The Author

Amory Lovins has published 28 books and hundreds of papers.  His work has been recognized by the Right Livelihood Award, Onassis, Nissan, Shingo and Mitchell prizes, a MacArthur Fellowship, the Happold Medal, eight honorary doctorates, and the Heinz, Lindbergh, World Technology, and Hero of the Planet Awards. Lovins has also acted as a consultant to many Fortune 500 companies.

See also

Brittle Power
Efficient energy use
Energy conservation
Hypercar
Peak oil
Plug-in Hybrid Electric Vehicle
Renewable energy commercialization
Soft energy technology
Soft energy path
The Carbon War: Global Warming and the End of the Oil Era

References

External links
 Winning the Oil Endgame presentation at MIT  - Video of Lovins.
 Amory Lovins: We must win the oil endgame (TED presentation)
  Winning the Oil Endgame - The Book Home Page - Read Free Online or Buy

2005 non-fiction books
2005 in the environment
Petroleum politics
Books about petroleum
Energy policy
Energy in the United States
Environmental non-fiction books
Fossil fuels in the United States
Books by Amory Lovins